The 2011 Men's EuroHockey Championship was the 13th edition of the EuroHockey Nations Championship, the biennial international men's field hockey championship of Europe organized by the European Hockey Federation. It was held from 20 to 28 August 2011 in Mönchengladbach, Germany.

This tournament also served as a qualifier for the 2012 Olympics, with the finalists and the team finishing in third position earning a spot. However, because England finished in the top three, the fourth team (Belgium) qualified instead, as England cannot qualify as a nation for the Olympics (they automatically participated as Great Britain).

The hosts Germany won its seventh title by defeating the Netherlands 4–2 in the final. The defending champions England won the bronze medal by defeating Belgium 2–1.

Qualified teams

Results
All times are local, CEST (UTC+2).

Pool A

Pool B

Fifth to eighth place classification
The points obtained in the preliminary round against the other team are taken over.

Pool C

First to fourth place classification

Semi-finals

Third place game

Final

Final standings

 Qualified for the 2012 Summer Olympics

 Qualified for the 2012 Summer Olympics as hosts

 Relegated to the EuroHockey Championship II

See also
2011 Men's EuroHockey Championship II
2011 Women's EuroHockey Nations Championship

References

External links
Official website

Men's EuroHockey Nations Championship
Men 1
EuroHockey Championship Men
International field hockey competitions hosted by Germany
EuroHockey Nations Championship
Field hockey at the Summer Olympics – Men's European qualification
Sport in Mönchengladbach
EuroHockey Championship Men
21st century in Mönchengladbach